Plusidia cheiranthi is a moth of the family Noctuidae. It is found in Southern and Eastern Europe, in Turkey, Siberia and eastwards to the Pacific Ocean.

The wingspan is 32–36 mm. Adults are on wing from June to August in one generation per year.

The larvae feed on the leaves of Thalictrum, Aquilegia and Erysimum  species. The egg overwinters.

References

Literature
 Barry Goater, László Ronkay und Michael Fibiger: Catocalinae & Plusiinae Noctuidae Europaeae, Volume 10., Sorø 2003

External links

 Lepiforum e. V.
 www.nic.funet.fi
lepidoptera.home.pl

Moths described in 1809
Plusiinae
Moths of Europe